Sphaeropteris lepifera, synonym Cyathea lepifera, the brush pot tree, is a tree fern that grows in the mountains of East and Southeast Asia, which can grow up to  tall. The plant has existed for over 300 million years and is considered a living fossil.

References

External links
 C. lepifera at the Taiwan Biodiversity Index 

lepifera
Flora of tropical Asia
Flora of temperate Asia